"All the World's a Stage" is the 16th episode of the fourth season of the American comedy-drama series, Ugly Betty, and the 81st episode overall. It originally aired on ABC in the United States on 17 March 2010.

Plot 
Justin loves his acting class, helmed by the eccentric Lena Korvinka (Carol Kane), and finds himself in an unexpected triangle with his new pals, Austin (Ryan McGinnis) and Lily. When Betty drops by class, she's smitten with a cool young playwright, Zachary (Aaron Tveit), whom she will profile for Mode. But she challenges her own ethics when she starts dating him. And Wilhelmina is hospitalized with a perforated ulcer, and can't help her type-A personality even when bedridden, but then her roommate, Roberta (Dana Ivey), prompts an epiphany.

Notes
The episode posted a large decrease in numbers from the previous week, with 3.3 million viewers tuning in, making it the absolute lowest result for an episode of Ugly Betty (taking the record from "Level (7) with Me" with 3.39 million viewers).
The episode ironically received good reviews. Website TV Fanatic said that the episode "had some funny moments - like when Betty punched Zack in the face - but, overall we thought it was more touching than anything else."
This episode features guest stars which include Broadway veteran Carol Kane (Lena Korvinka) and Next to Normal/Gossip Girl actor Aaron Tveit (Zachary Boule).

References

External links
"All the World's a Stage" at ABC
"All the World's a Stage at the Internet Movie Database

See also
 Ugly Betty
 Ugly Betty (season 4)

Ugly Betty (season 4) episodes
2010 American television episodes